Christian Kautz (born 23 November 1913 – died on 4 July 1948) was an auto racing driver from Switzerland.

Son of a Swiss multi-millionaire, his career started with Mercedes-Benz as a junior driver in 1936, then as an Auto Union junior driver in 1938, starting in three Grands Prix. Kautz was a testpilot for Lockheed in the United States during the Second World War. He died at only 34 years of age in a fatal accident in a Maserati at the 1948 Swiss Grand Prix in Bremgarten.

Racing record

Complete European Championship results
(key) (Races in bold indicate pole position) (Races in italics indicate fastest lap)

Notes
 – Not listed in the Championship.

Post WWII Grandes Épreuves results
(key) (Races in bold indicate pole position; races in italics indicate fastest lap)

References

External links
 

1913 births
1948 deaths
Swiss racing drivers
Racing drivers who died while racing
Swiss aviators
Sport deaths in Switzerland
Place of birth missing
European Championship drivers
Grand Prix drivers